The Council for Accreditation of Counseling & Related Educational Programs (CACREP) is a CHEA-recognized accreditor of counseling programs in the United States.

History
The Council was established in 1981 in order to set standards for counselor training. The first national conference was held from 7 to 10 October 1988 in St. Louis.
The Association for Counselor Education and Supervision (ACES) and the American Personnel and Guidance Association (a precursor to the American Counselor Association) discussed cooperative accreditation efforts for counseling programs. This ultimately led to CACREP's establishment.

CACREP serves as one of the four major entities of the counseling profession in the United States; the other three entities are the American Counseling Association the National Board of Certified Counselors and the American Mental Health Counselors Association.

Accreditation
CACREP accredits both master's and doctoral degree counseling programs. Current types of programs that can be accredited are:

Master's degree programs
 Addiction Counseling
 Career Counseling
 Clinical Mental Health Counseling
 Clinical Rehabilitation Counseling
 College Counseling and Student Affairs 
 Marriage, Couple and Family Counseling
 Rehabilitation Counseling
 School Counseling

Doctoral degree programs
 Counselor Education and Supervision

Accreditation can no longer be sought for the following programs:
 Community Counseling
 College Counseling
 Gerontological Counseling
 Marriage & Family Therapy
 Mental Health Counseling
 Student Affairs
 Student Affairs and College Counseling

See also
 List of recognized accreditation associations of higher learning

References

Higher education accreditation